A nonpossessory interest in land is a term of the law of property to describe any of a category of rights held by one person to use land that is in the possession of another. Such rights can generally be created in one of two ways: either by an express agreement between the party who owns the land and the party who seeks to own the interest; or by an order of a court.

Under the common law, there are five variations of such rights. These are:
easements
profits
restrictive covenants
equitable servitudes, and
licenses.

Property law
Real property law